Staunton National Cemetery is a United States National Cemetery located in the Shenandoah Valley, in Staunton, Virginia. Administered by the United States Department of Veterans Affairs, it encompasses just over a single acre, and as of the end of 2005 had 994 interments. It is closed to new interments, and is maintained by the Culpeper National Cemetery.

History
Designated a National Cemetery in September 1868, the original interments consisted of the remains of Union soldiers removed from Staunton's Thornrose Cemetery, several local battlefields, and nearby towns and counties. Many were soldiers who died during the American Civil War at the Battle of Cross Keys, Battle of Port Republic, and the Battle of Piedmont. More than 500 of these soldiers were reinterred as unknowns.

Staunton National Cemetery was listed on the National Register of Historic Places in 1996.

Notable interments
 Captain Nicolae Dunca (1837–1862), a Union officer on the staff of Gen. John C. Fremont and a Romanian by birth, who was killed while carrying a dispatch during the Battle of Cross Keys.

References

External links 
 National Cemetery Administration
 Staunton National Cemetery
 
 
 

Second Empire architecture in Virginia
Cemeteries in Staunton, Virginia
Tourist attractions in Augusta County, Virginia
United States national cemeteries
National Register of Historic Places in Staunton, Virginia
Staunton, Virginia
Cemeteries on the National Register of Historic Places in Virginia
Historic American Landscapes Survey in Virginia